The 2000 WNBA season was the fourth season for the New York Liberty. The team reached the WNBA Finals for the third time, but they were swept by the Houston Comets.

Offseason

Expansion Draft
The team lost Sophia Witherspoon and Ciquese Washington to the Seattle Storm and the Portland Fire, respectively.

WNBA Draft

Trades

Regular season

Season standings

Season schedule

Playoffs

Player stats

References

New York Liberty seasons
New York
New York Liberty
Eastern Conference (WNBA) championship seasons